William Kay (4 May 1893 – 7 July 1973) was an Australian cricketer. He played in three first-class matches for Queensland between 1919 and 1921.

See also
 List of Queensland first-class cricketers

References

External links
 

1893 births
1973 deaths
Australian cricketers
Queensland cricketers
People from Gympie
Cricketers from Queensland